The Mezhyhirya Residence is an estate in Ukraine where Viktor Yanukovych lived when he was Prime Minister and then President of Ukraine and is now a museum displaying Yanukovych's luxurious lifestyle. Yanukovych lived in the estate from 2002, when he first became Prime Minister, to 21 February 2014, when he fled the country during the Revolution of Dignity.

The estate was founded as a monastery that functioned off-and-on until closed in 1923 by the Bolsheviks following the establishment of the Soviet Union. From 1935 Mezhyhirya was a state government residence, first under the Communist Party of the Soviet Union and then under an independent Ukraine, until 2007 when it was privatized in the final weeks of Yanukovych’s leadership as Prime Minister. This privatization has been alleged as having been illegal, with no money being reported as being paid to the state for its sale. In 2012, the State Administration of Affairs rented a space from Tantalit for ₴99,691 per year, arranging it for official receptions. In 2014, it returned to state ownership.

There is a yacht pier, an equestrian club, a shooting range, a tennis court and other recreational facilities as well as hunting grounds. The estate also has an automobile museum displaying some of Yanukovych’s former exotic cars, a golf course, an ostrich farm, a dog kennel, numerous fountains and man-made lakes, a helicopter pad, and a small church. The entire complex is enclosed by a five-meter tall fence along the  perimeter.

During Yanukovych’s presidency, the estate became a controversial symbol of the increasingly authoritarian nature of his rule, as well as a symbol of the excess and corruption that defined his government and Ukrainian bureaucracy. Throughout his presidency, independently-aligned Ukrainian media, such as the Internet newspaper Ukrayinska Pravda, frequently detailed the excess reported at the complex, resulting in unspoken competition amongst journalists to detail the residence’s excess. Ukrayinska Pravda would spend over three years investigating reports of excess and misappropriation of public funds at the complex, with the newspaper publishing a number of documents that confirmed a link between organizations-tenants acting on behalf of Yanukovych, family members of Yanukovych and his entourage. Details of the residence’s excesses, such as the cost of its chandeliers, shocked and angered Ukrainians during Yanukovych’s presidency, with many rumours about the complex circulating throughout Ukraine in the early 2010s. During Euromaidan in 2013-2014, protesters descended on the complex, especially in December 2013, to protest against Yanukovych’s government. Protests at Mezhyhirya were also motivated by the belief held by the protestors that the complex was funded “improperly”, and also by an attack on 25 December 2013 on the journalist Tetiana Chornovol, who had been investigating the financing of the Mezhyhirya residence, and was attacked after unknown men in a jeep crashed into her car. The social movement Automaidan would organise many of the protests at Mezhyhirya, which would result in many of the movement’s vehicles being recorded by the police on a list. Many cars from the list would be burned, and owners of others would lose their driver’s licenses.

The controversial nature of the complex has persisted since Yanukovych’s ousting, with some Ukrainians refusing to visit it because it is connected to the former president of Ukraine and provokes negative emotions, though others have used it for their wedding photoshoots. 

Another luxurious residence was under construction near Cape Aya in Crimea at the time Yanukovych was ousted from office. The residence was popularly known as “Mezhyhirya 2”.

History

Until April 10, 1786, the space now occupied by the modern residence was inhabited by the Savior-Transfiguration Monastery, the establishment of which is attributed prior to the period of princely epoch in Kyiv, which was liquidated by the Russian Imperial edict of Catherine the Great. A year later, the monastery was set on fire, supposedly on the order of the same Catherine the Great. Ukrainian poet Taras Shevchenko wrote about the incident: "As tsaritsa with Nechesa walked around Kyiv and the Mezhyhirya Savior she set on fire at night". At the end of the 19th century the monastery was restored as a female monastery called "Intercession of the Saints", but in 1923 was once again closed by the Bolsheviks. During 1923–1931 the monastery building was used by as a college for ceramic production. Former cells of the monastery became occupied by a commune of artists-monumentalists. In 1931 the college was moved to Kyiv. At the same year the iconostasis of the Savior-Transfiguration Monastery was destroyed.

Mezhyhirya is also the former summer house of the Communist Party of the Soviet Union's leaders since 1935. During the occupation by Nazi Germany, it was a residence of the Reich Commissar Erich Koch in a palace of the Kiev Military District commander Iona Yakir. Before its privatization by the President of Ukraine Viktor Yanukovych (at that time Prime Minister of Ukraine), the residence belonged to the State recreation complex Pushcha Vodytsia.

Transformation into private property
Stepping into the post of Prime Minister of Ukraine in 2002, Viktor Yanukovych received free of charge building #20 with an area  in the residence from the Fund of State Property. By the agreement, the rental price was ₴3.14 per month for a period of 49 years for the purpose "implementation of measures for the promotion of national and international programs aimed at improving the socio-economic status".

Stepping out of the post of Prime Minister of Ukraine in 2005, Yanukovych received another building, #20-a.

In 2009 Yanukovych claimed to have full ownership. He has not revealed the price he paid for the property, instead calling it a "very serious price".

President of Ukraine Viktor Yanukovych chose it as his residence after he won the 2010 Ukrainian presidential election. This ownership was contested. Serhiy Leshchenko, of Ukrayinska Pravda, has claimed Yanukovych owned more of the estate than he claimed, and that he managed to do so through a complex ownership structure via a network of international holding companies that ultimately comes back to a firm called Tantalit, run by a lawyer close to the Yanukovych family, Pavlo Lytovchenko. The estate's level of luxury and the reconstruction of a road to it spawned controversy within Ukraine.

Transformation into museum
On 21 February 2014 Yanukovych fled Kyiv, and the police units that had guarded the residence during Euromaidan withdrew, with some guards reported to have escaped and protesters were able to enter it.  Before protestors entered, little had previously been known about the president’s home as Yanukovych had been relatively successful in keeping his private life away from the Ukrainian media.

Following that, thousands of Ukrainians went to visit the luxurious estate and park for free, with some nicknaming the complex "Yanukdisneyland" (a portmanteau of “Yanukovych” and “Disneyland”). Activists of Automaidan took care of the residence from the moment it was abandoned by security forces and turned it into a public park. Since then, an employee of Kyiv Zoo has been taking care of the animals and birds at the residence. Some protestors stated that the capture of Mezhyhirya was “the main symbol of our revolution [Euromaidan], our Bastille”.

On 23 February 2014 the Ukrainian parliament, the Verkhovna Rada, adopted a resolution to transfer Mezhyhirya as a recreational complex of Pushcha-Vodytsia to state ownership, within ten days. However this did not happen because of conflicts over control of the complex that emerged amongst some protestors and pro-European businessmen, as well as the legal confusion surrounding ownership of the estate. Looters and vandals were kept away from the complex by the former businessman and now groundskeeper of the site Denys Tarachkotelyk and his supporters, a group of protestors from the Maidan. Tarachkotelyk arrived at Mezhyhirya on the morning after Yanukovych fled and managed to outmaneuver rival factions to gain control of the entire property. The property returned to state ownership via court action on 25 June 2014. Since mid-November 2014 Mezhyhirya has been a museum which the public can visit, though the number of visitors has fallen sharply since February of 2014, when hundreds of thousands visited.

During the 2022 Russian invasion of Ukraine Mezhyhirya became a shelter for the residents of nearby villages. According to Mezhyhirya groundskeeper Denys Tarakhkotelyk the complex was hit by Russian air strikes and bombardments.

Mezhyhirya featured in the political satire Servant of the People.  In the series, the location was used for the inauguration of the President, who was played by Volodymyr Zelensky.  In 2019 Ukrainian voters elected Zelensky as President of Ukraine.

Former owners (2009–2014)

 Tantalit, LLC (“TOB”) (Russian: “Танталит”)
 Charitable Fund "Revival of Ukraine" (Russian: Благотворительный фонд "Возрождение Украины")

Renters
Before the Revolution of Dignity, the State Administration of Affairs rented an office in the residence.

Security services
 Berkut, State Security Administration (UDO) – security
 State Auto Inspection – road blocks, traffic restrictions
 Ukrainian Ground Forces (An anti-air mobile fire team of the Armed Forces of Ukraine was deployed on a breakwater in the Kyiv Reservoir in December 2012.)

In November 2011 "UkrAeroRukh" made Yanukovych's part of the Mezhyhirya residence a no-fly zone.

Featuring objects

Club house (Honka)
The main feature of the residence is the so-called "club house", also known as "object Honka" (after the Finnish log home manufacturer Honka). The building is located on territory belonging to the charitable fund "Revival of Ukraine". During 2009 and the first half of 2010, materials worth ₴76 million ($9.5 million) were delivered, for renovation of the house.

In 2010, speaking before the German public in Berlin, Viktor Yanukovych actually refuted his previous statements that he had nothing other than his house on the territory of "Mezhyhirya". Speaking that in his personal life he prefers "German quality", he noted: "It's no big secret to anyone... I built one such house, a club house... It was built by "Honka", a Finnish company..." After he fled the country during the Revolution of Dignity, Honka was squatted in by activists.

Barge
According to Ukrayinska Pravda, a reception house was designed for Viktor Yanukovych in 2011, based on a barge that was brought to Mezhyhirya and moored in the inner harbor. Officially, it is registered to the company Tantalit. The windows are decorated as round portholes.

As reported by Ukrayinska Pravda, the barge has a personal office and a hall for receptions. The "palace" is decorated with wood of valuable species, gold leaf, marble and crystal. In the niche of the ceiling of the main hall, there are three chandeliers, the price of one of which was estimated by Ukrayinska Pravda at $97,000.

Books
A journalist at Ukrayinska Pravda found various "ancient treasures of Ukrainian literature" in the residence on 25 February 2014, including the alleged first printed book in Ukraine (dating from 1654) by Ivan Fyodorov.

Photo gallery

Honka club house

Other features

Panoramic photos of Mezhyhirya
A group of photographers made a series of 360° panoramic photos outside and inside the buildings in Mezhyhirya on 11 March 2014, available on the Web site of the German news magazine Der Spiegel.

See also
 Putin's Palace
 Millerhof

References

External links

 Open Access – a movie on corruption in modern Ukraine, including the episode where the President of Ukraine refuses any explanations about Mezhyhirya. 
 Open Access (full video with English subtitles, YouTube)
 Leshchenko, S. Mezhyhirya: Paradise for Yanukovych (Part I, Part II). "Ukrayinska Pravda", 2010
 Mezhyhirya. Day of Journalist (2013). Telekritika.
 Chernovol, T. Six dachas of Yanukovych and three boxes of lies. Levyi bereg. August 31, 2009.

Official residences in Ukraine
Buildings and structures in Kyiv Oblast
Official residences in the Soviet Union
Political scandals in Ukraine
Museums in Kyiv Oblast
Viktor Yanukovych